Myron Ellis Witham (October 29, 1880 – March 7, 1973) was an American football player, coach of football and baseball, and mathematics professor.  He served as the head football coach at Purdue University in 1906 and at the University of Colorado at Boulder from 1920 to 1931, compiling a career college football record of 63–31–7.  He was also the head baseball coach Colorado from 1920 to 1925, tallying a mark of 29–25.  Witham was born in Pigeon Cove, Massachusetts, on October 29, 1880.  He attended Dartmouth College and was captain of the football team there in 1903.  Witham taught mathematics at Purdue, Colorado, the University of Vermont, and Saint Michael's College.  He died on March 7, 1973, in Burlington, Vermont.

Head coaching record

Football

References

1880 births
1973 deaths
Colorado Buffaloes baseball coaches
Colorado Buffaloes football coaches
Dartmouth Big Green football players
Purdue Boilermakers football coaches
All-American college football players
Purdue University faculty
University of Colorado faculty
University of Vermont faculty
People from Rockport, Massachusetts
Coaches of American football from Massachusetts
Players of American football from Massachusetts
Sportspeople from Essex County, Massachusetts